Theodore Harrison Easterly (April 20, 1885 – July 6, 1951) was a catcher in Major League Baseball who played for the Cleveland Naps (1909–1912), Chicago White Sox (1912–1913) and Kansas City Packers (1914–1915). Easterly batted left-handed and threw right-handed. He was born in Lincoln, Nebraska.

Easterly was a good contact hitter who batted over .300 four times. He jumped to the Federal League in 1914 and ended the season third in the batting race with a .335 average. A good defensive player with a solid throwing arm, he also served as a backup right fielder. In a seven-season career, Easterly was a .300 hitter with eight home runs and 261 RBI in 706 games played.

Easterly died in Clearlake Highlands, California, at the age of 66.

External links
, or Retrosheet

1885 births
1951 deaths
Baseball players from Nebraska
Beaumont Exporters players
Chicago White Sox players
Cleveland Naps players
Kansas City Packers players
Los Angeles Angels (minor league) players
Major League Baseball catchers
Sacramento Senators players
Salt Lake City Bees players
Sportspeople from Lincoln, Nebraska